John Duckett (1613 – 7 September 1644) was an English Catholic priest and martyr.

Life
John Duckett was born at Underwinder, in the parish of Sedbergh, in Yorkshire, in 1613, the son of James and Francis Duckett. He was a relative, possibly grandson, of James Duckett who had been executed at Tyburn on 19 April 1601 for printing Catholic books.

He was baptized on 24 February 1614 and educated at Sedbergh School. At the age of seventeen, he entered the English College, Douai; he was ordained a priest by the Archbishop of Cambrai in 1639 and was then sent to study for three years at the College of Arras in Paris.

He is said to have had an extraordinary gift of prayer, and as a student would spend whole nights in contemplation. After Paris it came time to embark on the English mission, but on his way he spent two months in retreat under the direction of his uncle, John Duckett, prior of the Charterhouse at Nieupoort. 

He arrived at Newcastle upon Tyne around Christmas 1643. Duckett worked largely in the North and laboured for about a year in Durham. It was in the time of the Civil War and he was arrested by Roundhead soldiers only a few months later, on 2 July 1644, at Redgate Head, Wolsingham, County Durham, while on his way to baptize two children. Taken to Sunderland, he was examined by a Parliamentary Committee of sequestrators and placed in irons. He admitted he was a priest and so was taken to London with the Jesuit Ralph Corby, arrested about the same time near Newcastle-on-Tyne. They were both confined in Newgate, where they were the cause of crowds of Catholics gathering. On these and on others who encountered them they made an impression by their cheerfulness and sanctity. He was brought to trial on 4 September and given the inevitable sentence of hanging, drawing and quartering. Corby was offered a reprieve, but deferred in favour of the younger Duckett, who refused to walk away and leave his friend. Both were executed at Tyburn in London on 7 September 1644.

Both priests were declared Blessed by Pope Pius XI on 15 December 1929.

Blessed John Duckett R.C Primary School is in Bishop Auckland, Durham.

See also
 Catholic Church in the United Kingdom
 Douai Martyrs

References

Sources
 
Godfrey Anstruther, Seminary Priests, Mayhew-McCrimmond, Great Wakering, vol. 2, 1975, pp. 90, 232.

1613 births
1644 deaths
Converts to Roman Catholicism
English College, Douai alumni
Martyred Roman Catholic priests
17th-century English Roman Catholic priests
17th-century Roman Catholic martyrs
Executed Roman Catholic priests
People executed by Stuart England by hanging, drawing and quartering
People from Sedbergh
Executed people from Cumbria
English beatified people
One Hundred and Seven Martyrs of England and Wales